Yoo In-na (born June 5, 1982) is a South Korean actress and DJ. After supporting roles in High Kick! Through the Roof (2009–10) and Secret Garden (2010), she rose to fame as the lead actress in Queen and I (2012), which led to a supporting role in My Love from the Star (2013–14). She is also known for her roles in Guardian: The Lonely and Great God (2016–17), one of the highest rated cable television series in South Korea and Touch Your Heart (2019).

Aside from acting, Yoo also ventured into radio. She was the DJ of Let's Crank Up the Volume from 2011 to 2016.

Career
At the age of 16, Yoo In-na joined an entertainment agency as an apprentice singer in 1998, and had nearly become part of a girl group. After 11 years and five different agencies, she could not be prominent. Yoo said she had difficulty memorizing the dance choreography required of K-pop singers, and after practicing for eight hours a day, six days a week, she had resigned from becoming an idol.

In 2006, Yoo joined YG Entertainment as an aspiring actress. She said, "If singing wasn't meant to be, I decided to give acting a go because it seemed fun. I never gave up. A lot of my friends did, though, even though they were prettier and more capable than me." She first came to note in 2009 with the sitcom High Kick Through the Roof on MBC. Several supporting roles followed, notably in the 2010 drama Secret Garden, which she received a Best New Actress award at the Baeksang Arts Awards, and as the second female lead in Hong sisters' romantic comedy The Greatest Love.

She was an MC for TV Entertainment Tonight from March 3, 2011, to June 4, 2012, for which she won Best Variety Entertainer at the SBS Entertainment Awards. She was also the DJ for KBS Cool FM's Let's Crank Up the Volume, which is the highest-rated radio program in its timeslot across both AM and FM bandwidths.

Yoo's vocals were featured in Humming Urban Stereo's 2011 digital single "You, That Day" (넌 그날). She also sang for the soundtrack of her 2011 film My Black Mini Dress alongside her castmates Yoon Eun-hye, Park Han-byul, and Cha Ye-ryun.

In 2012, Yoo starred in her first leading role in the tvN time-slip romance series Queen and I.

Personal life
At a June 7, 2012 fan meeting to mark the end of Queen and I, Ji Hyun-woo made a surprise public declaration that he was in love with co-star Yoo. The declaration was covered significantly by the press in the following days, during which their agencies, and Ji and Yoo had remained quiet on the issue, except for a message to his fans that Ji posted on Twitter on June 11. Speculation about their relationship status ended on June 17, when gossip website Sportsseoul.com photographed the couple together on a midnight date at a park in Bundang, Gyeonggi, where Yoo lives. On June 18, Yoo confirmed on her radio show that they were officially dating. On May 14, 2014, their respective agencies confirmed in a press release that the couple had ended their relationship.

Philanthropy 
On February 9, 2023, Yoo donated 30 million won to help in 2023 Turkey–Syria earthquake through Hope Bridge National Disaster Relief Association.

Filmography

Films

Television series

Web series

Television shows

Web shows

Music video appearances

Radio shows

Hosting

Discography

Singles

Awards and nominations

References

External links

 
 Yoo In-na Fan Cafe at Daum 
 
 

Living people
1982 births
People from Seongnam
YG Entertainment artists
South Korean television actresses
South Korean film actresses
South Korean radio presenters
South Korean web series actresses
South Korean women radio presenters
21st-century South Korean actresses